Bhishma is a 1962 Indian Telugu-language Hindu mythological film, based on the life of Bhishma from the epic Mahabharata, produced and directed by B. A. Subba Rao. It stars N. T. Rama Rao and Anjali Devi, with music composed by S. Rajeswara Rao.

Plot
The film begins in the court of Brahma where Mahabhisha (Prabhakar Reddy) and Ganga (Anuradha) are attracted to each other and Brahma curses them to be born as mortals. After that, Mahabhisha takes rebirth as Shantanu in the Kuru dynasty and he meets Ganga on banks of the river, requests her to marry him, she accepts on condition that he will not ask any questions about her actions. They married and she later gave birth to 7 children and drowns them in the river, when Ganga was about to drown the eighth son, Shantanu, devastated, could not restrain himself and confronted her. Finally, Ganga disappears along with the child. The child grows up as Devavratha (N. T. Rama Rao) a great warrior trained by Parasurama (Nagabhushanam). Once he meets his father Shantanu while hunting, without knowing his identity, Ganga appears and reunites father and son and goes away. A few years later, Shantanu comes across Satyavati (Sujatha), daughter of Dasaraju (A. V. Subba Rao), king of the fishermen and falls in love with her. Upon asking for his consent, her father agreed to the marriage on the condition that Satyavati's son would inherit the throne of Hastinapura. For his father's happiness, Devavratha a powerful vow that lifelong celibacy and of service to whoever sat on the throne of their dynasty, from that day he is named as Bhishma and his father gives him a boon to him that death will not come near to him until he calls.

After some time, Shantanu passes away and Satyavathi son Vichitravirya (Peketi Sivaram) becomes the king, in the process of finding a bride for him, Bhishma abducted princesses Amba, Ambika, & Ambalika of Kashi by defeating all the princes. After reaching Hastinapura, Amba (Anjali Devi) reveals that she is already in love with King Salwa (Kanta Rao), So Bhishma sends her back, but Salwa refuses to marry her because now she is owned by Bhishma. Amba approaches Bhishma and asks him to marry her, but he also refuses because of his oath. Then Amba reaches Parasurama and he orders Bhishma to marry her, Bhishma disagrees, the war begins between them and Parasuram is defeated. There, Amba takes an oath that she will take revenge against Bhishma, so, she performs severe penance to please Lord Shiva (Satyanarayana) and takes a boon that she will be the reason for Bhishma's death. As a result, Amba was reborn as Sikhandi, the beautiful woman later transformed into a man.

The Kurukshetra war begins, Bhishma was supreme commander of the Kauravas. The Pandavas are not able to defeat him for 10 days. Therefore,  on the ploy of Lord Krishna, (Haranath) Arjuna (Shobhan Babu) shoots arrows at Bhishma, keeping Sikhandi in front and he is collapsed on Ampashayya (bed of arrows). After completion of the war, Bhishma gives up his body on Uttarayana Punyakalam. Lord Krishna gives him a boon that the day shall be celebrated as Bhishma Ekadashi.

Cast

N. T. Rama Rao as Bhishma
 Master Nagaraju as young Bhishma
Anjali Devi as Amba / Shikhandi 
Kanta Rao as Salwa
Relangi as Narada Maharshi
Haranath as Lord Krishna
Shobhan Babu as Arjuna
Gummadi as Karna
Nagabhushanam as Parashurama
Dhulipala as Duryodhana
Satyanarayana as Lord Shiva
Prabhakar Reddy as Shantanu
Vangara as Rajaguru Madhava
C. S. R as Shalya
Peketi Sivaram as Vichitravirya
Malladi as Drupada 
A. V. Subba Rao as Dasaraju
A. V. Subba Rao Jr as Drona
Jagga Rao as Dushasana
Suryakantham as Dasaraju's wife
G. Varalakshmi as Kunti
Sujatha as Satyavati
Anuradha as Ganga
Meena Kumari as Hemangini
Susheela as Ambika
Malleswari as Ambalika 
Nirmalamma as Drupada's wife

Soundtrack

Music composed by S. Rajeswara Rao. Lyrics were written by Aarudhra.

References

External links
 

1962 films
1960s Telugu-language films
Hindu mythological films
Indian black-and-white films
Films based on the Mahabharata
Films directed by B. A. Subba Rao